Vršovice is a municipality and village in Opava District in the Moravian-Silesian Region of the Czech Republic. It has about 500 inhabitants.

History
The first written mention of Vršovice is from 1288.

References

External links

Villages in Opava District